Songshan is a town of Bairi (Tenzhu) Tibetan Autonomous County in southeastern Gansu province, China, located  due east of the county seat. , it has one residential community and 15 villages under its administration.

See also
List of township-level divisions of Gansu

References

Township-level divisions of Gansu